Henry Cadogan may refer to:

Henry Cadogan (1642–1713/14), Anglo-Irish lawyer, father of the first Earl Cadogan
Henry Cadogan, 4th Earl Cadogan (1812–1873), styled Viscount Chelsea between 1820 and 1864, British diplomat and politician
Henry Cadogan, Viscount Chelsea (1868–1908), British politician
Henry Cadogan (British Army officer) (1780–1813) who fell leading British troops at the Battle of Vittoria